Circle began as a peer-to-peer payments technology company that now manages the popular stablecoin USDC, a cryptocurrency the value of which is pegged to the U.S. dollar. It was founded by Jeremy Allaire and Sean Neville in October 2013. Circle is headquartered in Boston, Massachusetts. USDC is currently valued at $36 billion.

Funding 
The company has received over million in venture capital from 4 rounds of investments from 2013 to 2016, including million led by Goldman Sachs. In April 2015 The New York Times reporter Nathaniel Popper wrote that the Goldman Sachs investment "should help solidify Bitcoin’s reputation as a technology that serious financial firms can work with." In June 2016, Circle raised US$60 million in Series D funding backed by new and existing partners. On May 15, 2018, Circle raised US$110 million in venture capital to create USD Coin, an Ethereum coin they claim is backed by USD.Today, each USDC token is backed by USD.

In April 2022, Circle Internet Financial announced an agreement for a M funding round with investments from BlackRock, Fidelity Investments, Marshall Wace LLP and Fin Capital, expected to close in the second quarter.

History 
In September 2015, Circle received the first BitLicense issued from the New York State Department of Financial Services. In April 2016, the British government approved the first virtual currency licensure to Circle.

Circle's mobile payment platform, Circle Pay, allowed users to hold, send, and receive traditional fiat currencies, until being slated for discontinuation in 2019. Up until December 2016, Circle Pay also operated as a Bitcoin wallet service to buy and sell Bitcoins. It has since ceased to provide such service, claiming the company "is now more than ever not a consumer bitcoin exchange, and will continue to focus resources on global social payments and future next-generation blockchain technology".

In June 2019 it was announced that the Circle Pay mobile and web apps would be discontinued on September 30.

In February 2020, Circle sold its digital asset trading platform to Voyager Digital.

In July 2021, Circle announced a plan to merge with a special-purpose acquisition company called Concord Acquisition Corp in a $4.5 billion deal that would make Circle a public company. However, in December 2022 this deal was terminated.

In 2023, at the World Economic Forum's annual meeting in Davos, Switzerland, Allaire said the United States needs new statutory definitions of digital assets to provide regulatory clarity. He also said he hoped Circle will be regulated by the U.S. Federal Reserve and become an established financial player in order to distinguish the company from  recent implosions in the crypto industry.

On March 10, 2023, $3.3 billion of its $40 billion USD Coin reserves remain at Silicon Valley Bank, which was closed that day.All of the cash held as reserve has since been parked with Bank of New York Mellon Corp.

Services and features 
As of 2015 a Circle account could be funded in USD via "US-issued Visa and MasterCard credit and debit cards" and US bank accounts. As of 2016, European customers can also use Circle in EUR and GBP. Circle plans to peg the conversion rate to the US Dollar. Britain's Financial Conduct Authority granted Circle an electronic money license in April 2016, expanding the use of Circle's services to the United Kingdom and broadening Circle's relationship with UK bank Barclays. In June 2016, Circle announced it will begin expanding its services to China, where CEO Jeremy Allaire believes "there’s an opportunity for Chinese consumers that want to share value globally with friends in other parts of the world."

In December 2016 the Circle app stopped supporting the exchange of bitcoin but still allows money transfers. In October 2017, Circle launched a new service for group payments and cash transfers to US accounts.

Acquisitions 
On February 26, 2018, Circle announced that they purchased the Poloniex cryptocurrency exchange for $400 million. Amid the developments around the acquisition, one of Circle's leaked documents detailing its plans on operating Poloniex revealed the company's moves to become "The US's First Regulated Crypto Exchange" supported by its mutual understanding with the SEC.

While Circle announced the exchange would "spin out" in October 2019, it was revealed one month later that Justin Sun, founder of Tron, led the acquisition of Poloniex.

In October 2018 SeedInvest announced they entered an agreement to sell to Circle, subject to FINRA (Financial Industry Regulatory Authority) approval.

Investments 
In November 2021 Circle led a  million funding round in crowdfunding platform Crowdcube.

Criticism 
On July 9, 2022, author Matt Taibbi released an extremely critical overview of Circle's business practices in his article titled "The Financial Bubble Era Comes Full Circle".

References

External links
 

Bitcoin exchanges
Cryptocurrencies
2013 establishments in Massachusetts
Mobile payments
American companies established in 2013
Bitcoin companies